Cecilia Carranza Saroli (born 29 December 1986) is an Argentine Olympic sailor. At the 2012 Summer Olympics, she competed in the Women's Laser Radial class, finishing in the 21st place. At the 2008 Summer Olympics she finished 8th in the same event.  Cecilia won the gold medal at the 2011 Pan American Games. At the 2016 Summer Olympics she won the gold medal in the category Nacra 17 alongside fellow sailor Santiago Lange.

She qualified to represent Argentina with Lange at the 2020 Summer Olympics. She and Lange were Argentina's flag bearers for the opening ceremony.

She was born in Rosario, Argentina. She is openly lesbian.

Notes

References

External links
 
 
 
 

1986 births
Living people
Argentine female sailors (sport)
Olympic gold medalists for Argentina
Olympic sailors of Argentina
Olympic medalists in sailing
Sailors at the 2008 Summer Olympics – Laser Radial
Sailors at the 2012 Summer Olympics – Laser Radial
Medalists at the 2016 Summer Olympics
Pan American Games gold medalists for Argentina
Sailors at the 2011 Pan American Games
Sportspeople from Rosario, Santa Fe
Sailors at the 2016 Summer Olympics – Nacra 17
Pan American Games medalists in sailing
South American Games gold medalists for Argentina
South American Games medalists in sailing
Competitors at the 2010 South American Games
Medalists at the 2011 Pan American Games
Argentine LGBT sportspeople
Argentine lesbians
Sailors at the 2020 Summer Olympics – Nacra 17
21st-century Argentine LGBT people